The following is a list of notable deaths in September 2008.

Entries for each day are listed alphabetically by surname. A typical entry lists information in the following sequence:
 Name, age, country of citizenship at birth, subsequent country of citizenship (if applicable), reason for notability, cause of death (if known), and reference.

September 2008

1
Thomas J. Bata, 93, Czech-born Canadian businessman (Bata Shoes).
Inge Bausenwein, 87, German Olympic athlete.
Calvin Beale, 85, American demographer, colon cancer.
Ian Edward Fraser, 87, British recipient of the Victoria Cross.
Helen Galland, 83, American retail executive, president of Bonwit Teller (1980–1983), heart attack.
Kevin Heinze, 80, Australian pioneer gardening television presenter, heart attack.
Mel Ignatow, 70, American murderer, fall.
Carl Kaufmann, 72, German Olympic silver medallist (1960).
Sheldon Keller, 85, American comedy writer, complications from Alzheimer's disease.
Don LaFontaine, 68, American voice-over artist, complications from pneumothorax.
Henry Wako Muloki, 87, Ugandan Kyabazinga of Busoga since 1995, esophageal cancer.
Michael Pate, 88, Australian actor and writer, pneumonia.
Jerry Reed, 71, American musician ("When You're Hot, You're Hot", "East Bound and Down") and actor (Smokey and the Bandit), complications from emphysema.
Oded Schramm, 46, Israeli mathematician, fall.
Gerry White, 64, British businessman, prostate cancer.

2
Andreas Zeier Cappelen, 93, Norwegian politician and minister.
Todd Cruz, 52, American Major League Baseball player.
Arne Domnérus, 83, Swedish jazz alto saxophonist and clarinetist.
Joey Giardello, 78, American boxer, middleweight boxing champion (1963–1965), heart failure.
*Abdullah al-Harari, 98, Ethiopian-born Lebanese scholar, founder of the Al-Ahbash movement, natural causes.
Bill Melendez, 91, Mexican-born American animator (Peanuts).
Dame Alison Munro, 94, British civil servant and headmistress.
Julia Pirie, 90, British MI5 spy.
Sir Denis Rooke, 84, British industrialist.

3
Charles-Robert Ageron, 84, French historian.
Abdulla Alishayev, Russian Dagestani journalist, shot.
Lalla Bahia, Moroccan royalty, third wife of Mohammed V.
Donald Blakeslee, 89, American Air Force officer.
Paul DiLascia, 49, American software developer.
Françoise Demulder, 61, French war photographer, heart attack.
Mark Guardado, 46, American mobster, President of Hells Angels San Francisco chapter, shot.
Michael Hammer, 60, American management theorist, cranial bleeding.
Earl Lunsford, 74, American Canadian Football League player (Calgary Stampeders, Winnipeg Blue Bombers), Hall of Famer.
Ron Rivera, 60, American public health innovator, malaria.
Joan Segarra, 80, Spanish football player (FC Barcelona and manager.
May Shin, 91, Burmese actress and singer, pulmonary edema.
Pierre Van Dormael, 56, Belgian guitarist, cancer.
René Vingerhoet, 96, Belgian Olympic rower.
Géo Voumard, 87, Swiss composer and producer, founder of the Montreux Jazz Festival.
Jerry Zawadzkas, 62, American football player.

4
Fernest Arceneaux, 68, American Creole Zydeco accordionist and singer.
Mary Dunn, 66, American Iyengar Yoga instructor, peritoneal cancer.
Colin Egar, 81, Australian test cricket umpire.
Dick Enderle, 60, American football player.
Fon Huffman, 95, American World War II veteran, last survivor of the Panay incident.
Abdul Samad Ismail, 84, Malaysian journalist, lung infection and kidney failure.
Alain Jacquet, 69, French pop artist, cancer.
Jenny, 55, American western lowland gorilla, oldest gorilla in captivity (Dallas Zoo), euthanized.
Tommy Johnston, 81, British footballer, top scorer for Leyton Orient.
Erik Nielsen, 84, Canadian deputy prime minister (1984–1986), brother of Leslie Nielsen, heart attack.
Eduard Paukson, 72, Estonian astrologer.
Waldick Soriano, 75, Brazilian composer and singer, prostate cancer.
Fernando Torres, 80, Brazilian actor, voice-over artist, director and producer, husband of Fernanda Montenegro, emphysema.
Alina Vedmid, 68, Ukrainian politician.
Jerome Weber, 92, Canadian abbot of St. Peter-Muenster of Saskatchewan.

5
Kay Amert, 60, French scholar, cancer.
Raymond Bernabei, 83, American soccer player, complications of non-Hodgkin lymphoma.
Robert Giroux, 94, American editor and publisher (Farrar, Straus and Giroux).
Miroslav Havel, 86, Czech-born Irish chief designer (Waterford Crystal).
Thubten Jigme Norbu, 86, Tibetan lama (Taktser Rinpoche), eldest brother of the 14th Dalai Lama.
Lucian Pye, 86, American political scientist and sinologist, expert on Chinese politics, pneumonia.
Luis Santibáñez, 72, Chilean football team manager, complications from a kidney condition.
Mila Schön, 91, Italian fashion designer.

6
Aril Edvardsen, 69, Norwegian evangelical preacher and missionary.
Abd Al-Halim Abu-Ghazala, 78, Egyptian politician, field marshal and defence minister, throat cancer.
Antonio Innocenti, 93, Italian cardinal.
Nicole Lai, 34, Singaporean singer, skin cancer.
Allan Lawrence, 82, Canadian politician, MP for Northumberland—Durham (1972–1988).
Ray Loring, 65, American professor and composer, heart attack.
Sören Nordin, 91, Swedish harness racing trainer.
Anita Page, 98, American actress (The Broadway Melody), natural causes.
Larry Shaben, 73, Canadian politician, member of Legislative Assembly of Alberta (1975–1989), cancer.
Bill Shorthouse, 86, British footballer.
Mike Swoboda, 69, American politician, mayor of Kirkwood, Missouri (2000–2008), complications of shooting.

7
Kune Biezeveld, 60, Dutch theologian.
Ilarion Ciobanu, 76, Romanian actor.
Dino Dvornik, 44, Croatian actor and pop singer.
David Fitzsimons, 58, Australian Olympic athlete.
Peter Glossop, 80, British operatic baritone.
Don Gutteridge, 96, American Major League Baseball player, coach and manager.
Don Haskins, 78, American college basketball coach, heart failure.
Gregory Mcdonald, 71, American author (Fletch), cancer.
Nagi Noda, 35, Japanese pop artist and director, injuries from traffic accident.
Gordon Stromberg, 80, Canadian politician, member of Legislative Assembly of Alberta (1971–1986).
Richard "Popcorn" Wylie, 69, American musician.

8
Ahn Jae-hwan, 36, South Korean actor, body found on this date after suicide by carbon monoxide poisoning.
Riaz Ahsan, 56, Pakistani statistician and mathematician, cancer.
Nathan Green Gordon, 92, American politician and Medal of Honor recipient, Lt. Governor of Arkansas (1947–1967), pneumonia.
Celia Gregory, 58, British actress.
Ron Guthrey, 92, New Zealand politician, Mayor of Christchurch (1968–1971).
Ralph Plaisted, 80, American Arctic explorer, natural causes.
Evan Tanner, 37, American mixed martial arts fighter and UFC middleweight champion, body found on this date after apparent heat exposure.
Kunnakudi Vaidyanathan, 73, Indian violinist, after long illness.
George Zarnecki, 92, Polish art historian and medievalist.
Hector Zazou, 60, French composer and record producer.

9
Tina Allen, 58, American sculptor, pheumonia.
Betty Constable, 83, American squash player.
Eddie Crowder, 77, American football player and coach, complications of leukemia.
A. U. Fuimaono, 85, American Samoan politician, first Delegate to the United States House of Representatives (1970–1974).
Nina Lawson, 82, British wigmaker for the Metropolitan Opera, pernicious anaemia.
Jacob Lekgetho, 34, South African footballer.
P. N. Menon, 80, Indian film director, after long illness.
Warith Deen Mohammed, 74, American Islamic leader, son of Elijah Muhammad.
Richard Monette, 64, Canadian actor and director, pulmonary embolism.
Bheki Mseleku, 53, South African-born British jazz musician, diabetes.
Nouhak Phoumsavanh, 98, Laotian politician, president (1992–1998), natural causes.

10
Saleh al Aridi, 50, Lebanese pro-Syrian politician, car bomb.
Gérald Beaudoin, 79, Canadian lawyer and senator (1988–2004).
José Antonio Dammert Bellido, 91, Peruvian bishop.
Cameron Buchanan, 80, British footballer.
David Chipp, 81, British editor-in-chief (Press Association, Reuters), first resident correspondent for Reuters in China.
Patrick Flynn, 72, American composer and conductor, pulmonary embolism.
Robert Glasgow, 83, American organist and University of Michigan professor emeritus.
Florian Goebel, 35, German astrophysicist, fall.
Vernon Handley, 77, British conductor.
J. J. Harrington, 89, American politician.
Sherrill Headrick, 71, American football player, cancer.
Fitzroy Hoyte, 68, Trinidad Olympic cyclist.
Domagoj Kapec, 18, Croatian ice hockey player, car accident.
Frank Mundus, 82, American shark fisherman, alleged inspiration for Quint in Jaws, heart attack.
Gary O'Donnell, 40, British soldier, improvised explosive device.
Yuri Osipyan, 77, Russian physicist.
Reginald Shepherd, 45, American poet, cancer.
Paul Williams, 85, British politician, MP (1953–1964).

11
Bennett Campbell, 65, Canadian politician, premier of Prince Edward Island (1978–1979), cancer.
Dave Hanner, 78, American football player and coach (Green Bay Packers), heart attack.
Klaus Johann Jacobs, 71, German-born Swiss billionaire, cancer.
Fran Reed, 65, American teacher and fish skin artist, cancer.
Nils Johan Ringdal, 56, Norwegian author and historian.
Martin Tytell, 94, American manual typewriter expert, cancer.
Joan Winston, 77, American author, founder of Star Trek convention, Alzheimer's disease.

12
Camila Ashland, 97, American actress (Dark Shadows, 10).
George Brown, 85, American football player.
Simon Hantaï, 85, Hungarian-born French abstract artist.
Tomislav Ladan, 76, Croatian encyclopedist and polymath, malignant tumor.
Max Mermelstein, 65, American drug trafficker, cancer.
George Putnam, 94, American television news reporter, heart failure.
Bob Quinn, 93, Australian footballer (Port Adelaide) and Military Medal recipient.
Marjorie Thomas, 85, British opera singer, after long illness.
Paola S. Timiras, 85, American doctor, expert on the physiology of ageing, heart failure.
Ferenc Velkey, 92, Hungarian Olympic handball player.
Charlie Walker, 81, American country music singer, colon cancer.
David Foster Wallace, 46, American author and essayist (Infinite Jest), suicide by hanging.

13
Peter Camejo, 68, American politician and activist, lymphoma.
Dean Hoge, 71, American sociologist, specialist in American Catholicism, cancer.
Duncan Laing, 77, New Zealand swimming coach, cancer.
James Snow, 79, Canadian politician, member of Legislative Assembly of Ontario (1967–1985), diabetes.
Olin Stephens, 100, American yacht designer.
John Usher, 62, British academic lawyer, leukaemia.
Alice Van-Springsteen, 90, American stuntwoman, pneumonia.
Abdullah Wardak, Afghan governor of Logar Province, suicide attack.

14
John Burnside, 91, American inventor, brain cancer.
Hyman Golden, 85, American co-founder of Snapple Beverage Corporation, complications from stroke.
Ștefan Iordache, 67, Romanian actor, leukemia.
Georgi Kitov, 65, Bulgarian archaeologist, heart attack.
Lynn Kohlman, 62, American model and photographer, breast and brain cancer.
Lobsang Nyima Pal Sangpo, 79, Tibetan 100th Ganden Tripa (1994–2002), head of the Gelug school of Tibetan Buddhism.
*Mu Tiezhu, 59, Chinese basketball player, heart attack.
Ralph Russell, 90, British Urdu scholar.
Gennady Troshev, 61, Russian politician and military commander (Second Chechen War), plane crash.

15
Marion Dewar, 80, Canadian politician, mayor of Ottawa (1978–1985), fall.
Barthélémy Djabla, 72, Ivorian archbishop of Gagnoa.
Gangadhar Gopal Gadgil, 85, Indian writer, cancer.
Jean-Jacques Guissart, 81, French Olympic silver medal-winning (1952) rower.
Charlotte Kohler, 99, American editor, heart failure.
Danny Lawson, 60, Canadian ice hockey player (Minnesota North Stars, Buffalo Sabres, Detroit Red Wings).
John Matshikiza, 53, South African actor, writer and poet, heart attack.
Juraj Njavro, 70, Croatian doctor and politician, after long illness.
J. Patrick Rooney, 80, American insurance advocate.
Stefano Rosso, 59, Italian singer-songwriter and guitarist.
Richard Wright, 65, British keyboardist (Pink Floyd) and songwriter ("The Dark Side of the Moon"), cancer.

16
Verlie Abrams, 87, American football player.
Jack Alderman, 57, American murderer, execution by lethal injection.
Avraham Biran, 98, Israeli archaeologist, natural causes.
Elizabeth Douglas-Hamilton, Duchess of Hamilton and Brandon, 92, British peeress.
John Fancy, 95, British World War II RAF airman.
David Laycock, 61, English cricketer
Andrei Volkonsky, 75, Russian composer.
Charles Whitebread, 65, American professor of law, cancer.
Norman Whitfield, 68, American Motown songwriter ("I Heard It Through the Grapevine") and record producer, diabetes.

17
Princess Luluwah bint Abdulaziz Al Saud, 80, Saudi member of the royal family, sister of King Abdullah.
James Crumley, 68, American crime writer, complications from kidney and pulmonary diseases.
Didier Dagueneau, 52, French winemaker, plane crash.
Princess Iniga of Thurn and Taxis, 83, German princess.
José María Cirarda Lachiondo, 91, Spanish bishop of the Archdiocese of Pamplona y Tudela (1978–1993).
Anna Langford, 90, American politician, first African American woman to serve on the Chicago City Council, lung cancer.
Michael Omondi, 46, Kenyan field hockey player, after short illness.
Humberto Solás, 66, Cuban filmmaker, cancer.
Robert Steinberg, 61, American physician, co-founder of Scharffen Berger Chocolate Maker, lymphoma.

18
Ekaterina Andreeva, 66, Uzbek arachnologist.
Mauricio Kagel, 76, Argentine-born German composer.
Peter Kastner, 64, Canadian actor, heart attack.
Ron Lancaster, 69, American Canadian Football League quarterback and coach, heart attack.
Howard Mann, 85, American actor and comedian, cancer.
Sherman Parker, 37, American politician, member of Missouri House of Representatives (2003–2006), brain aneurysm.
Fabiola Salazar, 42, Peruvian congresswoman since 2006, car accident.
Henry Z. Steinway, 93, American businessman (Steinway & Sons).
Don Ultang, 91, American Pulitzer Prize–winning photographer.
Florestano Vancini, 82, Italian film director and screenwriter, after long illness.
John Webb, 82, American judge of the Supreme Court of North Carolina (1986–1998), Parkinson's disease.

19
Ernie Andres, 90, American college baseball coach and Major League Baseball player (Boston Red Sox).
Marcel Dierkens, 83, Luxembourgian cyclist.
Ned Harkness, 89, American ice hockey coach, stroke.
Jun Ichikawa, 59, Japanese film director.
David Jones, 74, British theatre and film director.
Dave Needham, 57, British bantamweight boxing champion (1974–1975).
Earl Palmer, 83, American rhythm and blues drummer, after long illness.
Robert Royston, 90, American landscape architect.
Dick Sudhalter, 69, American jazz trumpeter, pneumonia.

20
Nappy Brown, 78, American blues singer.
Francis A. Dennis, Liberian diplomat.
William Fox, 97, British actor.
Duncan Glen, 75, British poet, literary critic and designer, professor emeritus of visual communication (Nottingham Trent).
Steve Gray, 64, British musician.
Ken Harris, 45, American member of Baltimore City Council (1999–2007), shot.
Arne Haugestad, 73, Norwegian Supreme Court lawyer, Arne Treholt's defender.
Johnny H. Hayes, 67, American fundraiser for Al Gore's presidential campaigns, stomach cancer.
Willi Heidel, 92, Romanian Olympic field handball player.
Paul Howell, 57, British member of the European Parliament (1979–1994), plane crash.
George Larson, 96, Canadian Olympic swimmer.
Ed Sutton, 73, American football player, complications following heart bypass surgery.
John Taylor, 87, American military archivist at National Archives and Records Administration, heart failure.
Frank Valenti, 97, American mob boss (Rochester crime family).
Ivo Žďárek, 47, Czech ambassador to Vietnam (2004–2008) and Pakistan (2008), suicide bombing.

21
Mary Garber, 92, American sportswriter.
*Carlos González Cruchaga, 87, Chilean bishop of the Diocese of Talca (1967–1996).
Nancy Hicks Maynard, 66, American journalist, advocate for diversity in journalism, organ failure.
Sir Brian Pippard, 88, British physicist, Cavendish Professor of Physics (1971–1984).
Barefoot Sanders, 83, American federal judge, natural causes.
Paul Tansey, 59, Irish economics editor (The Irish Times).
Brian Thomsen, 49, American author and editor, heart attack.
Dingiri Banda Wijetunga, 92, Sri Lankan prime minister (1989–1993), president (1993–1994), after long illness.

22
Michael Andreevich, 88, Russian prince.
Plato Andros, 86, American National Football League player (Chicago Cardinals), Alzheimer's disease.
Olli Auero, 82, Finnish diplomat.
H. Dale Cook, 84, American federal judge since 1974, cancer.
Thomas Dörflein, 44, German zookeeper, surrogate parent of the polar bear Knut, heart attack.
Connie Haines, 87, American singer, myasthenia gravis.
Guillermo López Langarica, 40, Mexican YouTube celebrity, car accident.
Buddy McDonald, 85, American child actor (Our Gang), heart failure.
Petrus Schaesberg, 41, German art historian, suicide by jumping.

23
Mona Abul-Fadl, 62–63, Egyptian orientalist, breast cancer.
José Martins Achiam, 64, Portuguese karate coach, stroke.
Richard Henyard, 34, American murderer, execution by lethal injection.
Wally Hilgenberg, 66, American National Football League player (Minnesota Vikings), amyotrophic lateral sclerosis.
Rudolf Illovszky, 86, Hungarian footballer and manager, pneumonia.
Peter Leonard, 66, Australian broadcaster, mesothelioma.
Pedro Masó, 81, Spanish film director and producer, natural causes.
Brock McElheran, 90, Canadian conductor and composer.
Loren Pope, 98, American education consultant, heart failure.
Sonja Savić, 47, Serbian actress, heroin overdose.
Ellen Tarry, 101, American children's author.
William Woodruff, 92, British historian and author.

24
Bengt Anderberg, 88, Swedish poet, novelist, editor and playwright.
*Kwadwo Baah-Wiredu, 56, Ghanaian finance minister since 2005, after short illness.
Oliver Crawford, 91, American television writer blacklisted by the House Un-American Activities Committee.
Irene Dailey, 88, American actress (Five Easy Pieces, The Amityville Horror), colon cancer.
Sir Peter Derham, 83, Australian businessman and philanthropist, stroke.
Uno Laht, 84, Estonian writer.
Dick Lynch, 72, American football player and radio announcer (New York Giants), leukemia.
Maurits van Nierop, 25, Dutch international cricketer, fall.
Thiago Jotta da Silva, 24, Brazilian footballer, shot.
Cherry Smith, 65, Jamaican singer (The Wailers), heart attack.
Mickey Vernon, 90, American baseball player, stroke.
Vice Vukov, 72, Croatian singer and politician.
Claude Wilton, 89, Irish politician and solicitor.
Ruslan Yamadayev, 46, Chechen warlord and member of Russian State Duma, shot.

25
Glenn Andrews, 99, American politician, Representative (1965–1967), oldest surviving member of the House of Representatives.
Brian Donnelly, 59, New Zealand diplomat and politician, MP (1996–2008).
Esther Figueiredo Ferraz, 92, Brazilian Minister of Education (1982–1985) and first female minister, stroke.
Edward Klima, 77, American linguist, complications from brain surgery.
Horațiu Rădulescu, 66, Romanian composer, spectral music pioneer.
Ralph Sazio, 86, Canadian football coach (Hamilton Tiger-Cats).
Jimmy Sirrel, 86, British football manager (Notts County), after long illness.
Roger Vanderfield, 80, Australian rugby union referee, IRB chairman and ARU president.

26
Bernadette Greevy, 68, Irish mezzo-soprano, after short illness.
Joli Jászai, 101, Hungarian actress.
Géza Kalocsay, 95, Hungarian football player and manager.
Aggie Kukulowicz, 75, Canadian ice hockey player (New York Rangers), heart failure.
Phyllis Welch MacDonald, 95, American theater and film actress.
Raymond Macherot, 84, Belgian cartoonist.
Stanisław Marucha, 71, Polish Olympic shooter.
Jan Mazur, 88, Polish bishop of Siedlce.
Marian McQuade, 91, American founder of National Grandparents Day, heart failure.
Ernest Meissner, 71, Canadian Olympic diver.
Marc Moulin, 66, Belgian jazz musician and journalist, throat cancer.
Paul Newman, 83, American actor (The Sting, The Color of Money) and entrepreneur (Newman's Own), Oscar winner (1987), lung cancer.
Cirio H. Santiago, 72, Filipino filmmaker and producer, complications from lung cancer.
Yonty Solomon, 71, South African pianist, brain tumour.

27
Len Browning, 80, British footballer.
John Houston, 78, British painter.
Mahendra Kapoor, 74, Indian playback singer, heart attack.
Mario Maya, 71, Spanish dancer and choreographer, cancer.
Jimmy Murray, 72, British footballer, prostate cancer.
Henri Pachard, 69, American pornographic film director, throat cancer.
Olaf Poulsen, 88, Norwegian president of the International Skating Union (1980–1994).
Gerald Small, 52, American football player (Miami Dolphins).

28
Georges Adda, 92, Tunisian politician, heart attack.
Andrzej Badeński, 65, Polish Olympic bronze medal-winning (1964) athlete.
Osborn Elliott, 83, American editor of Newsweek (1961–1976), complications from cancer.
Jack Faulkner, 82, American football coach and administrator.
Margot Gayle, 100, American historic preservationist and author.
Malalai Kakar, 41, Afghan senior policewoman, shot.
Konstantin Pavlov, 75, Bulgarian poet and screenwriter, after long illness.
Athos Tanzini, 95, Italian Olympic fencer.
Thomas Thewes, 76, American businessman, co-owner of the Carolina Hurricanes, leukemia.

29
Youssef Sabri Abu Taleb, 79, Egyptian general.
Hayden Carruth, 87, American poet and literary critic, stroke.
Richard Clayton, 93, American actor and talent agent (Burt Reynolds, James Dean), heart failure.
Miguel Córcega, 79, Mexican actor and director.
Milt Davis, 79, American football player (Baltimore Colts), cancer.
Tim Fortescue, 92, British politician, MP (1966–1974).
Elinor Guggenheimer, 96, American philanthropist and author.
Louis Guss, 90, American actor (Moonstruck, Highlander, The Godfather).
Stan Kann, 83, American organist and Tonight Show regular, complications from heart procedure.
Sultan Salahuddin Owaisi, 72, Indian politician.
Antônio Sarto, 82, Brazilian bishop of Barra do Garças.
Glen Sheil, 78, Australian medical practitioner and politician, Senator (1974–1981, 1984–1990).
Anthony Spero, 79, American financier, leader of Bonanno crime family, after short illness.
*Relus ter Beek, 64, Dutch politician, Minister of Defence (1989–1994), abolished conscription, lung cancer.
Jock Wilson, 105, British soldier, UK's oldest D-Day veteran.

30
Henry Adler, 93, American drummer, teacher of Buddy Rich.
Ed Brinkman, 66, American baseball player and coach, lung cancer.
Sam Calder, 92, Australian politician and World War II fighter pilot, MP (1966–1980).
J. L. Chestnut, 77, American civil rights lawyer, kidney failure.
Richard Haine, 91, British Royal Air Force officer.
J. B. Jeyaretnam, 82, Singaporean politician, MP (1981–1986), NCMP (1997–2001), heart failure.

References

2008-09
 09